Stereotypes of Argentines are generalizations about Argentines that may or may not reflect reality. Stereotypes associated with Argentines vary from country to country depending on the prevalent stereotype in each culture. 

In Brazil, Chile and Uruguay, Argentines are stereotyped as arrogant, proud, narcissistic and racist. To this Argentines are also known for being gossipy, full of grandeur, liars (chantas), envious, quick and exaggerated in Uruguay. In addition to the above, Argentines have also been labeled as lazy, vain, and pedantic, but also kind and carefree, in scientific polls.

In some Spanish-speaking countries (like Spain, Colombia, Paraguay and Peru), Argentines are stereotyped as passionate –though somewhat coarse– as well as noble, honest, and kind.
Quite often in European countries such as Denmark and Norway, Argentines don't have the most favourable views towards them where they are often criticised as rather inward with their own fellow Spanish speaking crowd and rude as well as distant with others. It is often an issue where they choose these two countries of Scandinavia for high salary despite being known as the friendliest and welcoming places. They are considered not very fitting into Danish and Norwegian societies.

See also 
 Argentine nationalism

References

Argentines
Society of Argentina